Phil Adamson (born 20 March 1970) is an Australian former professional rugby league footballer who played in the 1990s.

Background
Phil Adamson was born in Taree, New South Wales, Australia, and he is the older brother of rugby league footballer; Matt Adamson.

References

External links
Saints Heritage Society

1970 births
Living people
Australian rugby league players
Manly Warringah Sea Eagles players
Parramatta Eels players
Penrith Panthers players
Rugby league players from Taree
Rugby league locks
Rugby league props
Rugby league second-rows
St Helens R.F.C. players